Sandan is a district within Kampong Thom Province, in central  Cambodia. According to the 1998 census of Cambodia, it had a population of 38,574.

Administration 
The following table shows the villages of Sandan District by commune.

References 

Districts of Kampong Thom province